Javonon is a town and jamoat in Tajikistan. It is located in Fayzobod District, one of the Districts of Republican Subordination. The jamoat has a total population of 13,359 (2015).

References

Populated places in Districts of Republican Subordination
Jamoats of Tajikistan